Horacio Bongiovanni (born 8 August 1950) is an Argentine former footballer who played as a midfielder.

References

1950 births
Living people
Association football midfielders
Argentine footballers
Boca Juniors footballers
Atlético de Rafaela managers
Pan American Games medalists in football
Pan American Games gold medalists for Argentina
Footballers at the 1971 Pan American Games
Argentine football managers
Medalists at the 1971 Pan American Games